José de Anchieta y Díaz de Clavijo, SJ (Joseph of Anchieta) (19 March 1534 – 9 June 1597) was a Spanish Jesuit missionary to the Portuguese colony of Brazil in the second half of the 16th century. A highly influential figure in Brazil's history in the first century after its European discovery, Anchieta was one of the founders of São Paulo in 1554 and of Rio de Janeiro in 1565. He is the first playwright, the first grammarian and the first poet born in the Canary Islands, and the father of Brazilian literature. Anchieta was also involved in the religious instruction and conversion to the Catholic faith of the Indian population. His efforts along with those of another Jesuit missionary, Manuel da Nóbrega, at Indian pacification were crucial to the establishment of stable colonial settlements in the colony.

With his book Arte de gramática da lingoa mais usada na costa do Brasil (1595, as Ioseph de Anchieta), Anchieta became the first person to provide an orthography to the Old Tupi language most commonly spoken by the indigenous people of Brazil.

Anchieta is commonly known as "the Apostle of Brazil". He was canonized by Pope Francis on 3 April 2014. He was the second native of the Canary Islands, after Peter of Saint Joseph Betancur, also a missionary to Latin America, declared a saint by the Catholic Church. Anchieta is also considered the third saint of Brazil.

Early life 
Anchieta was born on 19 March 1534, in San Cristóbal de La Laguna on Tenerife in the Canary Islands, Spain, to a wealthy family. He was baptized on 7 April 1534 in the Parish of Our Lady of Remedies (now La Laguna Cathedral). He lived in the building now known as Casa Anchieta in La Laguna until he was 14 years old.

His father, Juan López de Anchieta y Zelayaran, was a landowner from Urrestilla, in the Basque Country, who had escaped to Tenerife in 1525 after participating in an unsuccessful rebellion against the Emperor Charles V. Through him, Anchieta was related to Ignatius of Loyola, founder of the Society of Jesus. His mother was Mencia Díaz de Clavijo y Llarena, a descendant of the conquerors of Tenerife. Mencia was the daughter of Sebastián de Llarena, a Jew who had converted to Christianity, from the kingdom of Castile.

When he was 14 years old, Anchieta went to study in Portugal at the Royal College of Arts in Coimbra. He was intensely religious and felt he had a vocation to the priesthood. He sought admission to the Jesuit College of the University of Coimbra and was accepted into the Jesuits on 1 May 1551, at the age of 17. While he was a novice, he nearly ruined his health by his excessive austerity, causing an injury to the spine that made him almost a hunchback. He learned to write Portuguese and Latin as well as his mother tongue.

Missionary in Brazil 

In 1553, the Jesuits included Anchieta among the third group of their members sent to the Portuguese colony of Brazil, believing that the climate would improve his health. After a perilous journey and a shipwreck, Anchieta and his small group arrived in São Vicente, the first village that had been founded in Brazil in 1532. There he made his first contact with the Tapuia Indians living in the region.

In late 1553, Manuel da Nóbrega, the first Provincial of the Jesuits in Brazil, sent 13 Jesuits including Anchieta to climb the Serra do Mar to a plateau along the Tietê River that the Indians called piratininga (from Tupi pira "fish" + tininga "drying" – according to Anchieta, more than 12,000 fish could be found drying along the Tietê river floodplains after one of its customary floods). There the Jesuits established a small missionary settlement and celebrated Mass for the first time on 25 January 1554, date of the conversion of Saint Paul, according to tradition. That date is now celebrated as the founding of São Paulo. Anchieta and his Jesuit colleagues began their efforts to instruct the native people in the rudiments of Christianity and convert them, while also introducing basic education in other subjects. He taught Latin to the Indians, began to learn their language, Old Tupi, and started compiling a dictionary and a grammar. Their mission settlement, the Jesuit College of São Paulo of Piratininga, soon developed into a small population center.

Anchieta and Nóbrega had long opposed the way the Portuguese colonists were treating the Indians and had a serious conflict about it with Duarte da Costa, who served as second Governor-General of Brazil from 1553 to 1558. They nevertheless supported the Portuguese against their French rivals in establishing claims to Brazil and welcomed the support of Portuguese authorities against the Huguenot Protestants whom the French at times welcomed to their settlements. In fact, the two Jesuits saw the French colony as a generally Protestant enterprise, ignoring its Catholic components and making no distinction between Lutherans and Calvinists. Anchieta recognized that violence could be necessary to create the conditions for evangelizing the indigenous inhabitants and later praised the colony's third Governor General, Mem de Sá (1500–1572), for what he accomplished in killing large numbers of Amerindians.

Due to the systematic killings and ransacking of their villages by the Portuguese colonists and attempts at enslaving them, the Indian tribes along the coast of the present-day states of São Paulo, Rio de Janeiro and Espírito Santo rebelled and formed an alliance, the Tamoyo Confederation, which soon allied themselves to the French colonists who had settled in Guanabara Bay in 1555 under the command of Vice-Admiral Nicolas Durand de Villegaignon. The conflict was brutal and at once international and inter-religious. In one instance the Portuguese hung ten Frenchmen in an attempt to intimidate their enemies into submission. In another in 1557, a Protestant named Jacques le Balleur was put to death and Anchieta, in some interpretations, helped the executioner carry out the sentence, though the facts are much disputed.

The Tamoyo Confederation attacked São Paulo several times between 1562 and 1564 without success. Anchieta and Nóbrega initiated peace negotiations with the Tamoyos in the village of Iperoig in modern Ubatuba on the northern coast of São Paulo state. Anchieta's skill with the Tupi language was crucial in these efforts. After many incidents and the near massacre of Anchieta and Nóbrega by the Indians, they finally succeeded in gaining the Indians' confidence, and peace was established between the Tamoyo and Tupiniquim nations and the Portuguese.

Portuguese-French hostilities were renewed when Estácio de Sá, a nephew of the new Governor-General of Brazil, Mem de Sá, was ordered to expel the French colonists. With the support and blessings of Anchieta and Nóbrega, he departed with an army from São Vicente and founded the ramparts of Rio de Janeiro at the foot of Pão de Açúcar, in 1565. Anchieta was with him and participated in a number of battles between the Portuguese and the French, each side supported by their Indian allies. He acted as a surgeon and interpreter. He was also responsible for reporting back to the governor-general's headquarters in Salvador, Bahia, and participated in the final victorious battle against the French in 1567.

After the peace settlement, a Jesuit college was founded in Rio under the direction of Nóbrega. Anchieta was invited to remain and succeeded him upon his death in 1570. Despite his frailty and ill health, and the rigors of slow travel by foot and ship of the time, over the next ten years Anchieta traveled extensively between Rio de Janeiro, Bahia, Espírito Santo and São Paulo, consolidating the Jesuit mission in Brazil. In 1577 the fourth superior general of the Jesuits, Everard Mercurian, appointed Anchieta provincial superior of the order's members in Brazil.

As his health worsened, Anchieta requested relief from his duties in 1591. He died in Brazil on 9 June 1597, at Reritiba, Espírito Santo, mourned by more than 3,000 Indians.

Works 
In the tradition of Jesuits, Anchieta was a prolific rapporteur, communicating by letters to his superiors. His reports establish him as an ethnographer, though he focused on Amerindian behavior that did not follow European norms, such as their choice of marriage partners, cannibalism, and the role of sorcerers. His detailed testimony with respect to cannibalism is often cited by anthropologists. He explained, for example, that the Amerindians "believe that true kinship comes from the side of the fathers, who are the agents, and ... that the mothers are nothing more than bags in which the children grow" and therefore treat the children of a captured female and a member of their tribe with respect but sometimes eat the children of a captured male and a female member of their own tribe. He detailed the practice of polygamy and, because it had produced dense networks of interrelations, advocated easing the church's consanguinity rules to allow all but brothers and sisters to marry.

Anchieta was a pioneer in transcribing the Old Tupi language and authored the first published work on that language, a "pathbreaking" grammar, Arte de gramática da língua mais usada na costa do Brasil, written in 1555 and published in 1589. According to one assessment, "His grammar and dictionary still rank among the best ever produced of a Brazilian language, nearly 500 years later.... Anchieta was a dedicated linguist whose work can be considered the beginning of Amazonian linguistics (indeed it would not be stretching matters too far to call his work the beginning of linguistics in the Americas." His written works in the indigenous language span theology, religious instruction, theater and poetry.

He was also a historian, author of a biography of Mem de Sá. Composed of hexameters, De Gestis Meni de Saa is the first epic about the Americas. It presents de Sá as "a Christian Ulysses determined to oust Satan" who "presides ... over hordes of demonic Amerindians, creatures devoted to dismembering bodies". With the arrival of the Jesuits, "the Cross expels demons" and "shamans lose preternatural power as they move from the wilderness into the civilized missions". That work of history was one of his two major poems. The other was De Beata Virgine Dei Matre, a poem to the Virgin Mary. Tradition holds that Anchieta composed it while in captivity at Iperoig in 1563 by writing verses in the wet sand of the beach and memorizing each day's lines so that upon his release he could write its 4,900 verses on paper in their entirety.

His dramas, written in a combination of Tupi, Portuguese, Spanish, and Latin, were not meant for the stage but for performance by local amateurs in village squares and churchyards. They were traditional in form, written in verse with five-line stanzas, a literary form known as the auto, a Portuguese devotional drama, following the tradition the Jesuits had developed of using the theater first in classrooms and then for popular instruction. Casts were all male, both native and European, and both groups were meant to learn from the dramas' instruction in Christian morals. They were written for special occasions like a saint's feast day or to mark the arrival of relics in the colony. Scholars have noted that they contain considerable "contextual information", that is references to local events such as village rivalries. For example, Amerindian cannibalism is juxtaposed with the roasting of Lawrence of Rome. Few of his plays survive, but those that do have been praised, despite being crafted for a local audience with a didactic purpose, for their "remarkable feeling for spectacle, calling for the use of body paint, native costumes, song and dance, fights, torches, and processions". A performance might even call for cannon fire from a nearby ship, though the plays were typically "short on action and long on explanations of doctrine" and characters fall clearly into positive and negative types. Anchieta's "auto da pregação universel" of 1567 and published in 1672 is the first dramatic text in Brazilian letters.

As a keen naturalist, he described several new plants and animals among the novelties of Brazil's wildlife and geography.

His lucid and detailed reports are still important for understanding the beliefs, manners, and customs of the native peoples and European settlers of the sixteenth century.

He was also an excellent surgeon and physician.

His manuscripts were gathered from archives in Portugal and Brazil in the 1730s as part of the process for his beatification and deposited in Rome. His works have been published as Cartas, Informações, Fragmentos Históricos e Sermões (Letters, Reports, Historical Fragments and Sermons).

Legacy 
José de Anchieta is celebrated as the founder of Brazilian letters and, with Nóbrega, Apostle of Brazil. He has given his name to two cities, Anchieta, in the State of Espírito Santo (formerly called Reritiba, the place where he died), and Anchieta, in the state of Santa Catarina, as well as many other places, roads, institutions, hospitals, and schools. The French botanist A.St.-Hil., who explored Brasil in the 19th century, named a climbing vine of the Violaceae family for the late Jesuit: Anchietea.

In 1965, the Spanish postal service issued a stamp with the image of Anchieta, in a series called "Los Forjadores de América".

Ney Latorraca starred in the Brazilian biographical film, Anchieta, José do Brasil, which was released in 1977.

Veneration

When beatified by Pope John Paul II in 1980, Anchieta acquired the title "Blessed José de Anchieta." Pope Francis announced his canonization as a saint on 3 April 2014. The announcement was first communicated to three priests from the Canary Islands (hometown of Anchieta) who attended the Mass of the Pope in his residence in Santa Marta, who communicated it to the Bishop of Tenerife, Bernardo Álvarez Afonso.

He used a process known as equivalent canonization that dispenses with the standard judicial procedures and ceremonies in the case of someone long venerated. Anchieta was the first Spaniard canonized by Pope Francis.

During and after his life, José de Anchieta was considered almost a supernatural being. Many legends formed around him, such as that he once preached to and calmed an attacking jaguar. To this day, a popular devotion holds that praying to Anchieta protects against animal attacks.

José de Anchieta is highly revered in the Canary Islands. A bronze statue by Brazilian artist Bruno Giorgi in the city of San Cristóbal de La Laguna depicts José de Anchieta departing for Portugal. It was a gift from the Government of Brazil to Anchieta's hometown, where a wooden image of him is also venerated in the Cathedral of La Laguna and carried in procession through the streets every 9 June. In the Basilica of Our Lady of Candelaria (patron saint of the Canary Islands), there is a painting of José de Anchieta founding the city of São Paulo. In 1997, a biographical comic book was published.

Patronage
José de Anchieta is the patron saint and model of catechists. He was also declared by Pope Benedict XVI as one of the thirteen Intercessors of the World Youth Day 2013, held in Rio de Janeiro.

In April 2015 he was declared by the National Conference of Bishops of Brazil a copatron of Brazil, whose patron saint is Our Lady of Aparecida.

Shrines in his honor
The main shrines dedicated to Saint José de Anchieta in Brazil and the Canary Islands are those that are directly related to his life:

  (Canary Islands): In the city of San Cristóbal de La Laguna, his place of birth, the main diocesan shrine is the Cathedral of San Cristóbal de La Laguna, where he was baptized in 1534 and where his image is venerated. Each 9 June in this city flowers are strewn at the large bronze statue of the saint and a solemn Mass is held in the cathedral with the Bishop of Tenerife presiding, followed by a procession with his image through the streets to his birthplace, where flowers are again strewn.
 : The National Shrine of San José de Anchieta is located in the town of Reritiba (now called Anchieta) in the state of Espirito Santo. The sanctuary has an important museum of sacred art and is built in the place where he lived the last years of his life and died. Here the national holiday dedicated to the saint is celebrated with pilgrimages of faithful from throughout Brazil. Following the declaration of Anchieta as copatron of Brazil in 2015, the church was declared a National Shrine.

See also
 List of saints of the Canary Islands
 Jesuit Reductions
 Colonial Brazil
 France Antarctique

References

Sources
 Helen Dominian, Apostle of Brazil: The Biography of Padre José Achieta, S.J. (1534–1597) (NY: Exposition Press, 1958)
 Jorge de Lima, Anchieta (Rio de Janeiro: Civilisaçao Brisiliera, 1934)

External links
  Biography of San José de Anchieta, Diocese of Tenerife
  José de Anchieta, Santo
  San José de Anchieta
  A Catalog of Anchieta's Works: National Library Foundation, Brazil
   Facsimile reproductions of Anchieta's poems and some of his sources for contrafacta
  
  Cartas, Informações, Fragmentos Históricos e Sermões: Facsimile reproduction of the principal collection of Anchieta's published works
 Association for the Canonization of Anchieta 
 Images of Anchieta on stamps, seals, and coins
 
 
 

1534 births
1597 deaths
Brazilian people of Jewish descent
Canarian people of Jewish descent
People from San Cristóbal de La Laguna
Spanish people of Basque descent
Spanish people of Jewish descent
Saints of the Canary Islands
University of Coimbra alumni
Jesuits from the Canary Islands
16th-century Spanish Jesuits
Roman Catholic missionaries from the Canary Islands
Spanish male writers
Writers from the Canary Islands
Brazilian male writers
Jesuit missionaries in Brazil
Grammarians from Spain
16th-century Spanish writers
16th-century male writers
People of Colonial Brazil
Brazilian grammarians
Burials in Brazil
Beatifications by Pope John Paul II
Canonizations by Pope Francis
Jesuit saints
Spanish Roman Catholic saints
Portuguese Roman Catholic saints
Brazilian Roman Catholic saints
Linguists of Tupian languages
France Antarctique
Jesuit provincial superiors
Missionary linguists
People from Coimbra